Busaiteen is a Bahraini multi-sports club based in Busaiteen. The club competes in football, volleyball, table tennis and track and field.

Achievements
Bahraini Premier League 
 Champions (1): 2013
Bahraini FA Cup 
 Champions (1): 2003

Notable managers
 China (2004–05)

Volleyball team
The club's Volleyball team is one of the strongest teams in Bahrain. The team includes several International players. The team has won many championships in the youth and junior tournaments.

References

 Busaiteen Volleyball Riffa Views, sport news. Retrieved August 13, 2008.

External links
 Fans Forum

Football clubs in Bahrain
1945 establishments in Bahrain
Association football clubs established in 1945